Bellamy or variation may refer to:

Places
 Bellamy, Alabama, USA
 Bellamy, Missouri, USA
 Bellamy, Virginia, USA
 Bellamy River, New Hampshire, USA

People
 Bellamy (surname), people with the surname Bellamy 
Bellamy Young, actress from the ABC hit show Scandal

Art, entertainment, and media

Fictional entities
 Bellamy (One Piece), a character from Eiichirō Oda's manga One Piece
 Elizabeth Bellamy, a fictional character in Upstairs, Downstairs
 Hazel Bellamy, a fictional character in Upstairs, Downstairs
 Howard Bellamy (Doctors), a character from the British soap opera Doctors
 Lady Marjorie Bellamy, a fictional character in Upstairs, Downstairs
Bellamy Blake, a character from The 100 TV series

Other art, entertainment, and media
 Bellamy (film), a 2009 French film by Claude Chabrol
 Bellamy (TV series), Australian crime drama
 The Bellamy Brothers, an American country group most popular in the 1970s and 1980s

Other uses
 Bellamy salute (U.S. Pledge of Allegiance)
 Bellamy's, the catering service of the New Zealand Parliament

See also

 Bel Ami (disambiguation)
 Belle Amie (disambiguation)